Martin or Marty Cooper may refer to:

Martin Cooper (musicologist) (1910–1986), English music critic and author
Martin Cooper (inventor) (born 1928), designer of the first mobile phone
Marty Cooper (musician) (born 1942), American musician
Martin Cooper (rugby union) (born 1948), England international rugby union player
Martin Cooper (musician) (born 1958), British painter and a musician
Martin Cooper (born 1974), American drag queen performing under Coco Montrese